Peter Plantec is a writer, digital artist and software designer.

Career
As president of Virtual Personalities, Inc., Plantec was responsible for the design and development of Sylvie, the first practical commercial virtual human interface using an animated human face. He is Contributing Editor of STUDIO magazines in New York and a columnist at VFXWorld.

In 2004 he published Virtual Humans, around which has grown a community of software developers, graphic artists and A.I. researchers.

Plantec is a frequent presenter and host at various film and animation conferences worldwide.  He is co-chair of Mundos Digitales in A Coruña, Spain and hosts and sits on the Board of Associates of FMX, Europe's largest digital entertainment conference in Stuttgart where he curates and hosts the FMX Virtual Humans Forum. In 2008, he was a special guest of the People of China at their ICCIE international arts and culture expo, where he gave several talks on virtual humans. He is also an advisor to Design Cinema Conference in Istanbul, and VIEW Conference in Turin. He also gave a talk about virtual humans at SIGGRAPH ASIA in Singapore, in 2008. In 2010, he was a special guest at the Academy of Motion Pictures Arts and Sciences for a presentation on virtual actors arranged to assuage fears that virtual actors would take jobs from Screen Actors Guild members.

Plantec is an organizer and moderator for the 5D Conferences, which are supported by the University Art Museum at Long Beach, California, and the Art Directors Guild, Hollywood.

Works
 Virtual Humans: A Build-It-Yourself Kit, Complete with Software and Step-by-Step Instructions ; Creating the Illusion of Personality. New York, NY: AMACOM, 2004. 
 Caligari TrueSpace2 Bible. Foster City, CA: IDG Books Worldwide, 1996.

References

External links
 Official website

American columnists
American graphic designers
American digital artists
People from Milltown, New Jersey
Living people
Year of birth missing (living people)